The 2008 Premier Basketball League season was the first in the league's history, and ended with the Rochester Razorsharks winning the inaugural PBL championship. Ten teams played a 20-game regular season schedule, and all ten teams would qualify for the league playoffs.

Final standings

Playoff Bracket

External links
 2008 PBL Playoffs - Official Website
 PBL Weekly Press Release – March 24, 2008
 2008 PBL Official Site

2008
2007–08 in American basketball by league
2008–09 in American basketball by league